DEI may refer to:

Business and organisations
 Dale Earnhardt, Inc., a NASCAR team
 Dayalbagh Educational Institute, in Agra, India
 Directed Electronics, Inc., American manufacturer of vehicle security systems
 Public Power Corporation, (Greek: Δημόσια Επιχείρηση Ηλεκτρισμού, Dimosia Epicheirisi Ilektrismou) the Greek national electrical company
 Senckenberg German Entomological Institute (formerly German Entomological Institute, German: Deutsches Entomologisches Institut), an entomological research institute in Germany

Other uses
 Dei Rural LLG, a local government in Papua New Guinea
 DEI (Dabney Eats It), motto of Dabney House at Caltech, U.S.
 Diversity, equity, and inclusion, an organizational equality training term
 Doofenshmirtz Evil Incorporated, a fictional company 
 Development Effectiveness Indicator, an effectiveness measure for development finance
 Benedetto Dei (1417–1492), Italian poet and historian

See also
 
 Deus (disambiguation) (dei is the genitive singular of deus)
 Deus, the Latin word for "god" or "deity"
 Dutch East Indies